This is a list page of the mountains and hills found in the Indian state of West Bengal. It includes a list of the highest mountains in each of the constituent districts. Hills greater than 1,000 meter AMSL are categorized as Mountains and less than 300 meter AMSL are categorized as Hillocks. Sandakfu is the highest peak of the state located in the Singalila Ridge of Himalayas while Gorgaburu is the highest peak in the southern West Bengal on Ajodhya Hills of the extended Eastern Ghats.

Peaks

Mountains

Hills

Hillocks

See also 
 Joychandi Pahar
 Geography of West Bengal
 List of mountains in India

Mountains and hills
West Bengal